A mudra (Sanskrit for sign or symbol) is a term woven into compositions in Indian classical music, particularly Carnatic music, that indicates the identity of the composer, a patron, the raga, tala, or style. A composer might use his own name or a pseudonym. Not all composers have mudras, and they do not necessarily relate to the composer's name.

Etymology
A mudra is a pen name, nom de plume, or pseudonym adopted by a musician to serve as their sign of authorship in a musical composition. A pen name may be used to make the author's name more distinctive, to disguise their gender, to distance an author from some or all of their previous works, to protect the author from retribution for their writings, to combine more than one author into a single author, or for any of a number of reasons related to the marketing or aesthetic presentation of the work. The author's name may be known only to the publisher, or may come to be common knowledge.

All most every time, the penname is inserted in the wordings of the composition or poem in a artistically meaningful way.

List of Mudras used by Musicians

Hindustani Musicians

Carnatic Musicians

References

Carnatic music